The Victorian Railways rail tractors are a small shunting unit used by the Victorian Railways of Australia for moving railway wagons in at country stations and private sidings. Varying in power output and size, they are agricultural tractors on top of a four-wheeled steel rail wagon frame. RT1 was of a different design to the remainder of the class and is preserved at the Newport Railway Museum, Victoria.

The shunters are not fitted with air brakes but are through-piped to enable them to be worked dead as part of a normal train. An exception to that is RT46, a standard "Aresco Trak Chief", the only one of its type built for the VR, which entered service in 1966. RT54 is a one-off unit acquired from the Portland Harbour Trust, which had used the vehicle on its private siding. In March 1989, it was reported that a refurbishment program for rail tractors was being undertaken at the Ballarat Railway Workshops and, as units went through the program, they were repainted into the then-current V/Line orange livery.

Units currently authorised to operate on Victorian tracks are RT 3-40, 42-43 and 45-53, the second group being more powerful, and all are permitted to travel at 15 km/h maximum. Units RT 18, 28 and 43 were gauge converted and transferred to Sydney for use on the construction of the Epping to Chatswood railway.

Liveries
The first RT tractors were painted red or silver, but yellow had become the norm by the 1970s.

In the period 1982–1983, they were stencilled with a number-code, exceptions being RT42, RT46 and RT51. When they were refurbished for V/Line, most tractors had the code letters placed first, except 20RT at Redcliffs in 1988, and 48RT at Maryborough in 1987. Of the refurbished units, 5, 11, 20, 29, 45, 47, 48 and 53 had orange underframes with white steps, while 7 and 21 had black underframes and steps.

Maximum loads
As of mid-1986, RT units were limited to 30 km/h and the following loads:

Fleet details
Note: Zero prefix is not accurate, but displayed here for sorting function.

See also
New South Wales X100 class
New South Wales X200 class

References

rail tractor
Broad gauge locomotives in Australia
Railway locomotives introduced in 1952
Standard gauge locomotives of Australia